Elizabeth (or Emily) Whitfield Croom Bellamy (pen name, Kamba Thorpe; 1837–1900) was an American novelist and essayist.

Biography
Elizabeth (or Emily) Whitfield Croom Bellamy was born in Quincy, Florida, 17 April 1839. She was educated in Springer Institute, New York City. She taught in a female seminary in Eutaw, Alabama, for several years. Bellamy wrote under the pen-name "Kamba Thorpe" (sometimes misspelled, "Kampa Thorpe") Four Oaks (New York, 1867), and Little Joanna (New York, 1876). Additional works included Old Man Gilbert (1888) and The Luck of the Pendennings (1895, Ladies Home Journal). She contributed essays to the Mobile Sunday Times. 

Bellamy died in 1900. Her biography, Elizabeth Whitfield Croom Bellamy: The Life and Works of a Southern Bell (University of Texas at Austin, 1996) was published by Dorothy McLeod MacInerney.

References

Citations

Attribution

Bibliography

External links
 
 

1837 births
1900 deaths
19th-century American writers
19th-century American women writers
American women novelists
American women essayists
American essayists
People from Quincy, Florida
Novelists from Florida
Wikipedia articles incorporating text from A Woman of the Century